The 1937 Fox vault fire was a major fire that broke out in a 20th Century-Fox film-storage facility in Little Ferry, New Jersey, United States, on July 9, 1937. Flammable nitrate film had previously contributed to several fires in film-industry laboratories, studios, and vaults, although the precise causes were often unknown. In Little Ferry, gases produced by decaying film, combined with high temperatures and inadequate ventilation, resulted in spontaneous combustion.

One death and two injuries resulted from the fire, which also destroyed all the archived film in the vaults, resulting in the loss of most of the silent films produced by the Fox Film Corporation before 1932. Also destroyed were negatives from Educational Pictures to Belarusfilm (with which Fox was then affiliated) and films of several other studios. The fire brought attention to the potential for decaying nitrate film to spontaneously ignite and changed the focus of film preservation efforts to include a greater focus on fire safety.

Background

Nitrate film

The early motion-picture industry primarily used film stock made of nitrocellulose, commonly called nitrate film. This film is flammable and produces its own oxygen supply as it burns. Nitrate fires burn rapidly and cannot be extinguished, as they are capable of burning even under water. Nitrocellulose is also subject to thermal decomposition and hydrolysis, breaking down over time in the presence of high temperatures and moisture. This decaying film stock releases nitrogen oxides that themselves contribute to the decay and make the damaged film burn more easily. Under the right conditions, nitrate film can spontaneously combust. In part because of substantial variability in the manufacturing of early film, considerable uncertainty exists about the circumstances necessary for self-ignition. Most such fires in film archives have taken place in heat waves during summers, in closed facilities with limited ventilation, compounding several of these variables. Especially in confined areas, such fires can result in explosions.

Large and dangerous fires sometimes resulted. On May 4, 1897, one of the first major fires involving nitrate film began when a Lumière projector caught fire at the Bazar de la Charité in Paris. The resulting blaze caused 126 deaths. In the United States, a series of fires occurred at industry facilities. The Lubin Manufacturing Company's vault in Philadelphia exploded on June 13, 1914, followed on December 9 by a fire that destroyed Thomas Edison's laboratory complex in West Orange, New Jersey. The New York studio of the Famous Players Film Company burned in September 1915; in July 1920, the shipping facility of its corporate successor, Famous Players-Lasky, was destroyed by a fire in Kansas City, Missouri, despite construction intended to minimize that risk. The United Film Ad Service vault, also in Kansas City, burned on August 4, 1928, and a fire was reported at Pathé Exchange nine days later. In October 1929, the Consolidated Film Industries facility was badly damaged by a nitrate fire. Spontaneous combustion was not proven to have occurred in any of these fires, and may not have been recognized as possible before a 1933 study determined that the temperatures necessary for nitrate film to self-ignite had been overestimated.

Little Ferry
In the earlier 20th century, nearby Fort Lee on the Hudson Palisades was home to many film studios of America's first motion picture industry. When Little Ferry, New Jersey, contractor William Fehrs was hired to construct a film-storage facility in 1934, he designed the structure to be fireproof. The building had  brick outer walls and a reinforced concrete roof. Internally, it was divided into 48 individual vaults, each enclosed behind a steel door and separated by  brick interior walls. The local fire department confirmed Fehrs's fireproofing. However, it had neither a fire sprinkler system nor mechanical ventilation, and no security guard was employed to watch the facility. Despite the potential fire danger of stored film, the building was located in a residential neighborhood.

Film processing company DeLuxe Laboratories owned the building and rented it to 20th Century-Fox to store the silent films acquired from Fox Film Corporation after its merger with Twentieth Century Pictures.

Fire

The sustained heat contributed to nitrate decomposition in the film vaults, and the building's ventilation was inadequate to prevent a dangerous buildup of gases. At some time shortly after 2:00am on July 9, spontaneous ignition occurred in the vault at the building's northwest corner. Local truck driver Robert Davison observed flames coming from one of the structure's window vents, and within five minutes, used a municipal fire alarm call box to report the fire.

Davison then attempted to awaken the residents of the surrounding houses, many of whom were already alerted to the situation by the noise and intense heat. As the contents of additional vaults ignited, bursts of flame shot out  horizontally across the ground from the windows, and a similar distance into the air from the building's roof vents. When the fire spread to the vaults in the south and east of the building, they exploded, damaging the brickwork and blowing out window frames. Anna Greeves and her two sons, John and Charles, were caught in a "sheet of flame" while attempting to flee the area. All three were seriously burned; 13-year-old Charles eventually died from his injuries on July 19. Other families were able to escape unharmed, as the fire spread to five neighboring residences and destroyed two vehicles.

Little Ferry firefighters first arrived at 2:26am, followed by companies from Hawthorne, Ridgefield Park, River Edge, and South Hackensack. It took 150 men employing 14 hose streams to put the fire out by 5:30am. All the film in the facility was destroyed; more than 40,000 reels of negatives and prints burned to ashes inside their film cans. The building was also badly damaged. Exploding vaults had destroyed segments of both the exterior walls and interior partitions, and had deformed the structure's concrete roof. Total property damage was estimated at $150,000–200,000. Fifty-seven truckloads of burned film were hauled from the site to have their silver content extracted. Each can contained about five cents' worth of silver; the salvaged metal returned $2,000.

Legacy

Although 20th Century-Fox officials at the time remarked that "only old films" were destroyed, the fire is now understood as a significant loss of American film heritage. Motion picture historian Anthony Slide called the destruction of the Fox vault "the most tragic" American nitrate fire. The highest-quality examples of every Fox film produced prior to 1932 were destroyed; all known copies of many movies had been stored in the facility. Films lost to the fire include pictures starring Theda Bara, Shirley Mason, William Farnum, and many others. Tom Mix made 85 pictures with Fox, most of which were archived exclusively at Little Ferry. The grandfather of director Blake Edwards, J. Gordon Edwards, had directed all the highest-grossing epics for Fox and all the masters for his films were lost (although a few survive as low-quality prints, which were housed elsewhere). For some actors, such as Valeska Suratt, none of their films survived; "there are entire careers that don't exist because of [the fire]," according to Museum of Modern Art film curator Dave Kehr. Because some copies were located elsewhere, some of Fox's silent films survive as lower-quality printsor fragmentsbut more than 75% of Fox's feature films from before 1930 are completely lost.

The Little Ferry vaults also held works by other film studios that had contracted with Fox for distribution. Educational Pictures lost more than 2000 silent negatives and prints; the company's sound films survived. Also present was the original negative of D. W. Griffith's Way Down East (which Fox had purchased with the intent of remaking), the negative for the controversial Christie Productions sponsored film The Birth of a Baby and films produced by Sol Lesser under his imprints Atherton Productions, Peck's Bad Boy Corporation, and Principal Pictures. Archival material intended for the Museum of Modern Art's Film Library was lost, as well.

The destruction of the Little Ferry facility spurred an interest in fire safety as an aspect of film preservation. Unlike previous large nitrate-film fires, investigators determined that the spontaneous combustion of decomposing film stock was responsible. They suggested that the older nitrocellulose film in the archive was of lower quality than their current film, thus more unstable. The Society of Motion Picture Engineers' Committee on Preservation of Film, three months after the vault fire, cited "recent and rather extensive film fires" as evidence that existing preservation efforts had failed to adequately address the risk of fire. More heavily reinforced film vaults were suggested, to prevent fires in a single vault from destroying entire archival facilities. Film storage cabinets with ventilation and cooling systems were also proposed, as was further research into improving the quality of cellulose acetate film to encourage its use as a safer replacement for nitrate film. By the 1950s, the use of nitrate film in the United States had been essentially eliminated.

See also

 America's first motion picture industry
 List of building or structure fires
 List of Fox Film films
 1965 MGM vault fire, also destroyed many silent and early sound films
 2008 Universal Studios fire, destroyed thousands of audio master tapes
 Cleveland Clinic fire of 1929, caused by the combustion of X-ray film

Notes

References

Bibliography

 
 
 
 
 
 
 
 

1937 disasters in the United States
1937 in American cinema
1937 fires in the United States
20th Century Studios

Building and structure fires in the United States
Fires in New Jersey
1937 in New Jersey
 
July 1937 events
Warehouse fires
Little Ferry, New Jersey
Articles containing video clips
Nitrate-film fires in the United States